Erling Asbjørn Kongshaug (22 March 1915 – 14 September 1993) was a Norwegian rifle shooter. He competed in the 1952, 1956 and 1960 Olympics in 50 meter rifle three positions and 50 meter rifle prone and won a gold medal in the three positions event in 1952. He also won 13 medals at the ISSF World Shooting Championships from 1947 to 1954.

References

External links

1915 births
1993 deaths
Norwegian male sport shooters
ISSF rifle shooters
Olympic gold medalists for Norway
Olympic shooters of Norway
Shooters at the 1952 Summer Olympics
Shooters at the 1956 Summer Olympics
Shooters at the 1960 Summer Olympics
Olympic medalists in shooting
Medalists at the 1952 Summer Olympics
Sportspeople from Oslo
20th-century Norwegian people